Scooter Shooter is a horizontally scrolling shooter released in arcade by Konami on 1985. It includes competitive play against either a computer opponent or another player.

Legacy
Scooter Shooter was made available by Microsoft for its Game Room service for the Xbox 360 and Games for Windows – Live in July 2010.

References

External links
 
 Scooter Shooter at Arcade History

1985 video games
Arcade video games
Konami games
Shooter video games
Konami arcade games
Video games developed in Japan